Ireland is an unincorporated community in Madison Township, Dubois County, in the U.S. state of Indiana.

History
The town was founded on land purchased from the United States government by John Stewart, a native of Ireland, on December 23, 1816. The town was once intended to be called American City, but changed to Ireland when the name was not approved by the post office department.  The town was laid out by John Stewart's son James, and four others.  The first town map is dated May 20, 1865, but had been a small village many years before that.

The Ireland post office has been in operation since 1853. Ireland's school system was absorbed by the Jasper school system in 1970.

On the night of February 28, 2017, an EF2 tornado associated with the February 28, 2017, tornado outbreak struck Ireland. Several homes were destroyed, however no injuries were reported.

Religion

Ireland is home of St. Mary's Church, a Roman Catholic church.

Geography

References

External links

Irish-American culture in Indiana
Unincorporated communities in Dubois County, Indiana
Unincorporated communities in Indiana
Jasper, Indiana micropolitan area
1816 establishments in Indiana
Populated places established in 1816